Jordan Way is an Australian professional rugby union referee.

Refereeing career
Way has been a member of Rugby Australia's match officials panel since 2015, having previously played rugby union before injuring his collarbone. He has been a Rugby sevens referee at the World Rugby Sevens Series since 2016, and hoped to officiate at the 2020 Olympic Games. He was appointed to the officiating list for the 2021 Super Rugby AU season in February 2021.

References

Australian rugby union referees
Living people
ARU referees
Sportsmen from Queensland
Year of birth missing (living people)
Super Rugby referees
21st-century Australian people